Crna River ( / Црна ријека, "Black River") is the only larger left tributary  of Ilomska River. It originating from Duboki jarak ("Deep trench"),  altitude of 1380 m, below the hill Blatnica Hill. After leaving the ravine, the river flows  around Jove masiff turn right to the north to the mouth.

During the Austro-Hungarian rule, along the Crna River (as with Ilomska) built forest narrow-gauge railway to the turntables in 1178 for the exploitation of forest resources, which turnstile at this place as always abounds. Even today there performs intensive felling spruce and fir trees.

References

Rivers of Bosnia and Herzegovina